Some Prefer Cake is a lesbian and feminist film festival in Bologna, Italy. It was established in 2009 to celebrate the richness of lesbian international film.

History 
The festival was founded in 2006 by Luki Massa and Marta Bencich, who continued to direct and organize it, until 2014, when Massa became ill. She died in 2016. The Fuoricampo Lesbian Group, which had always been involved in the festival, reorganized with other key festival personnel to create the Luki Massa Association, and renewed the festival in 2017, which is now produced by the Comunicattive Association, and dedicated to Massa.

Some Prefer Cake is a political endeavor, dedicated to fighting fascism, racism, repression and violence, and supporting those who fight and "boycott the neoliberal and neofundamentalist systems of patriarchal power". The festival considers itself part of this fight, giving visibility to women's and rebel non-conforming lesbian's stories, in the struggle against heteronormativity, illness, loneliness, environmental destruction, and politically oppressive systems.

In addition to screening over 50 films depicting these stories in various genres, including narrative, short, documentary, animation, web series and experimental, the festival includes discussion and panels, art exhibits, social gatherings and a party. The festival takes place over 5 days, and hosts over 6000 attendees.

Awards 
The festival grants an audience awards, and also grants jury awards for the best films in the documentary, fiction and short film categories.

See also 
 List of women's film festivals
 Women's cinema
 List of LGBT film festivals

References

External links 
 

Women's film festivals
Annual events in Italy
Film festivals established in 2006
Film festivals in Italy
Feminism in Italy
2006 establishments in Italy
LGBT in Italy
Lesbian events
Lesbian feminism
LGBT film festivals